Happy Valley Terminus is a tram stop and one of the seven termini of Hong Kong Tramways, a double-decker tram system. Located in Happy Valley, it is one of the system's two termini in the Wan Chai District on Hong Kong Island.

Routes
Happy Valley ↔ Kennedy Town
Happy Valley ↔ Shau Kei Wan

References

Hong Kong Tramways stops